Juraj Sklenár (Georgius Szklenár; 25 February 1745 – 30 January 1790) was a Slovak historian, pedagogue and Catholic priest.

Life 
He was born in Tiba, a manor-house near Levoča. Sklenár entered the Jesuits as a novice in 1764 and become a doctor of philosophy. He worked in Levoča, Trnava, Prešov and Košice. After the abolition of the Jesuit order, he worked as a professor of rhetoric and deputy director at main royal grammar school in Pressburg (today's Bratislava). A part of Sklenár's works are Latin odes and occasional speeches related to his pedagogic position. In the 1770s, he already become more known among scientists. In the Geographic Lexicon of the Kingdom of Hungary (1876) he is mentioned as the pride of Pressburg. Sklenár, together with Juraj Papánek, Juraj Fándly and Samuel Timon created the first scientific works about the earliest history of Slovaks. Slovak enlightenment historians already paid attention to Great Moravia and the mission of Saints Cyril and Methodius, but did not adopt yet a deciding position. In 1784, Sklenár published his most important work Vetustissimus magnae Moraviae situs et primus in eam Hungarorum ingressus et incursus, geographice, historice, critice descriptus. He tried to separate the history of Great Moravia from the Slovak history and proposed the location of its center to Sremska Mitrovica. According  to Richard Marsina, regardless of this mistake, Sklenár belonged among most qualified and most critical historians of Bernolák's generations.

Works 
 Synchronisticon Josepho e com. Battyány S. R. I. principi et primato Hungariae
 Raroria naturae monumenta in Ungaria occurentia
 Origo er genealogia Illustris Battyaniorum Gentis
 Vetustissimus magnae Moraviae situs et primus in eam Hungarorum ingressus et incursus, geographice, historice, critice descriptus
 Hypercriticon examinis vetustissimi m. Moraviae situs et vindiciarum anonymi Belae regis scribae (St. Katona)
 Onomasticon honoribus Mariae Theresiae
 Oratio inaug. Occasione instauratarum Posonii litterarum
 Onomasticon honoribus M. Theresiae Aug. Hung. Reginae
 Oratio inaug. in Regio Posoniensi Gymnasio habita 1777 (scientias in Hungaria instauratas novumque systema introductum).
 Ode in adventum Clementis AA. et Electoris Trevirensis
 Ode in reditum Josephi II. Parisiis
 Ode in reditum com. Francisci Balassa e commissione regia
 Oratio quam pro die 13. Maji 1780. dum sub praesidio comitis Balassa reg. Tallosiense orphanotrophium Szemptzini collocaretur adornavit
 Laudatio funebris in exequiis Antonii Mancini professoris Posoniensis. U. ott, 1783.
 Georgii Papanek compendiata historia gentis Slavae, per Georgium Fándy cum notis G. Szklenar. Tyrnaviae, 1793.

References

Sources

External links 
 Juraj Sklenár 

1744 births
1790 deaths
19th-century Hungarian historians
Slovak Roman Catholic priests